San Domenico School is the oldest independent, private, coed day and boarding school in California and the closest coed boarding school to San Francisco, California. The school currently enrolls 680 boys and girls in Grades Kindergarten through Twelfth Grade. It is a member of the National Association of Independent Schools. The mascot is a Panther. The school colors are blue and green.

History 
Founded in 1850 in Monterey by Mother Mary of the Cross Goemaere, O.P., of the Dominican Order, as St. Catherine Academy (not to be confused with St. Catherine's Academy), San Domenico is the oldest independent school in California. In 1965 the school moved to its present location in Sleepy Hollow, San Anselmo. In 2014, the school's high school became coed, and officially became non-religious in 2017.

Campus 
The campus is situated on 515 acres (0.803 mi2) and includes a music conservatory, digital arts lab, riding stables, hiking and mountain biking trails, swimming center, gymnasium, one-acre organic garden, large field, 2,358 solar panels, and six tennis courts.

Boarding program 
San Domenico High School is a coeducational day, boarding and flex-boarding school. Boarding students live on-campus during the school year while flex boarding students spend Monday through Friday on campus and then return home for weekends. The boarding program has a large number of international students, including students from Brazil, Canada, Czech Republic, mainland China, Germany, Hong Kong, Italy, Mexico, Poland, Russia, Serbia, South Africa, South Korea, Switzerland, Rwanda, Taiwan, Thailand, Uganda, Vietnam, and Zimbabwe.

Bus system 
San Domenico administers one of the most extensive school bus route systems in the Bay Area. Grade levels K – 12 utilize the bus system, and service covers the Bay Area, including Oakland, San Francisco, and Novato.

Organization
It is member of the National Association of Independent Schools (NAIS), California Association of Independent Schools (CAIS), and Western Association of Schools & Colleges (WASC).

Academics 
 Over 90% of the Class of 2020 were accepted into one of their top choice colleges.

Service Learning 
All students are required to take the social justice course in their junior year, which helps students develop a systemic approach to understanding the social and environmental challenges of our day. Each student chooses a cause and initiates an independent action plan. The projects span from local initiatives within the school community and county to global initiatives around the world.

Reputation 
San Domenico School is a recognized Common Sense Media Signature School (Digital Citizenship Certified).

The San Domenico High School Theatre Arts Group was one of 50 school theatre groups in North America selected to perform in the Edinburgh Fringe Festival in 2007, 2010, and 2013.

San Domenico School received the Green Ribbon Schools Award from the US Department of Education for excellence in sustainability practices in 2014. San Domenico was the first school in Marin County to receive this honor.

San Domenico School’s Virtuoso Program Orchestra da Camera was the Festival Grand Champion and First Place String Orchestra at the National Orchestra Festival competition in 2010, 2008, and 2005.

Athletics 
The school offers cross country, soccer, tennis, golf, basketball, swimming, track, baseball, flag football, badminton, volleyball, lacrosse, and sailing.

References

External links 
 

High schools in Marin County, California
San Anselmo, California
Private K-12 schools in California
Educational institutions established in 1850
1850 establishments in California
Private high schools in California
Preparatory schools in California
Boarding schools in California